WGLQ is an FM radio station serving the central portion of Michigan's Upper Peninsula.  WGLQ broadcasts at a frequency of 97.1 megahertz and its studios and offices are located on Ludington Ave in Escanaba, Michigan.  The station airs a Top 40 (CHR) format. WGLQ's transmitter is co-located on the WJMN-TV tower located 30 miles north of Escanaba near the town of Trenary, which extends 1,070 feet high.

History

The station first signed on in 1976 as WKZY-FM, playing beautiful music and then evolving into an adult contemporary format as "Z97", and then back to beautiful music.  On April 26, 1982, the call letters were changed to WGLQ, and the format became CHR as "The Rhythm of the Great Lakes." Magic 97 was a "live-assist" station with TM Programming's Stereo Rock format for a time, then converted to fully local programming in the late 1980s. The format has cycled back and forth between mainstream and Adult Top 40 over the years. Current staff includes TJ Ryan, Susie Larson, Kent Bergstrom, and Tommy Kay.

References
Michiguide.com - WGLQ History

External links

GLQ
Contemporary hit radio stations in the United States
Radio stations established in 1976
1976 establishments in Michigan